That Kind of Summer is a Canadian film directed by Denis Côté and released in 2022. It had its world premiere at the 72nd Berlin International Film Festival in official competition on February 14, 2022. This is the fourteenth feature film by the filmmaker and his fourth selection in official competition at the Berlinale.

Plot 
Three women are invited to a nursing home for 26 days to explore their sexual discomfort. The young protagonists named Léonie, Eugénie and Geisha, respectively played by Larissa Corriveau, Laure Giappiconi and Aude Mathieu, are accompanied in their healing process by a German therapist (Octavia) and a benevolent social worker (Sami).

Cast 
 Larissa Corriveau : Léonie
 Laure Giappiconi : Eugénie
 Samir Guesmi : Sami
 Aude Mathieu : Geisha
 Anne Ratte-Polle : Octavia

Release 
In January 2022, France's Shellac boarded worldwide sales of the film. That Kind of Summer had its world premiere at the 72nd Berlin International Film Festival on February 14, 2022.

Awards and nominations

References

External links 
 

2022 films
2022 drama films
Canadian drama films
2020s French-language films
Films shot in Quebec
Films directed by Denis Côté
French-language Canadian films
2020s Canadian films